is a passenger railway station located in the city of Akashi, Hyōgo Prefecture, Japan, operated by the private Sanyo Electric Railway.

Lines

Station layout
The station consists of two elevated island platforms with the station building underneath. The station is staffed.

Platforms

Adjacent stations

|-
!colspan=5|Sanyo Electric Railway

History
It was renamed o its present name on 7 April 1991.

Passenger statistics
In fiscal 2018, the station was used by an average of 15,225 passengers daily (boarding passengers only).

Surrounding area
 Akashi Station, JR West
 Akashi Castle

See also
List of railway stations in Japan

References

External links

 Official website (Sanyo Electric Railway) 

Railway stations in Japan opened in 1923
Railway stations in Hyōgo Prefecture
Akashi, Hyōgo